The list of shipwrecks in 1979 includes ships sunk, foundered, grounded, or otherwise lost during 1979.

January

1 January

6 January

7 January

8 January

10 January

19 January

February

6 February

14 February

19 February

28 February

Unknown date

March

7 March

10 March

15 March

16 March

29 March

30 March

April

7 April

18 April

27 April

28 April

May

13 May

16 May

17 May

20 May

26 May

June

12 June

13 June

18 June

21 June

26 June

30 June

July

1 July

3 July

4 July

5 July

19 July

24 July

August

3 August

5 August

11–15 August

26 August

27 August

31 August

September

6 September

14 September

19 September

21 September

23 September

24 September

29 September

Unknown date

October

6 October

8 October

12 October

13 October

November

4 November

6 November

8 November

10 November

14 November

15 November

23 November

24 November

30 November

Unknown date

December

1 December

5 December

6 December

14 December

16 December

18 December

19 December

20 December

24 December

25 December

26 December

30 December

31 December

Unknown date

References

1979
 
Ships